The Franz Kafka Videogame is an indie adventure game inspired by the writings of Franz Kafka. It was developed by Denis Galanin.

Plot 
The protagonist named K. gets a sudden offer of employment. And this event changes his life, forcing him to make a distant voyage. To his surprise, the world beyond his homeland appears to be not as normal as he would think.

Gameplay 
The Franz Kafka Videogame features gameplay similar to previous mif2000's game.

The player interacts with the world with simple point and click interface. The goal of The Franz Kafka Videogame is to solve a series of puzzles and brain teasers. The puzzles are sequentially linked forming an adventure story. The game contains no inventory, and the solving of puzzles mainly consists of clicking onscreen elements in the correct order. Solving a puzzle will immediately transport the player character to the next screen.

Development 
The Franz Kafka Videogame was developed over a period of 2.5 years, by Denis Galanin.

The game was fully improvised throughout the entire period of development.

Reception 

The announcement of The Franz Kafka Videogame in 2013 attracted the interest of such non-video game media as  Time, NBC News, NY Daily News, etc.

On review aggregate OpenCritic, The Franz Kafka Videogame had an average 66 out of 100 review score with 10% approval rating based on 10 reviews. 

On review aggregator Metacritic, the game received a 64 out of 100, indicating "mixed or average reviews". Critics praised the visual style, while criticizing the short length and confusing puzzles. Riot Pixels said the game was "a beautiful nightmare, cozy and purple like A-minor." Renata Ntelia at Adventure Gamers said it was "a pleasant little puzzle game that will evoke a lightweight nostalgia for people that have prior knowledge of its namesake’s work," but argued that "its limited gameplay ultimately doesn’t provide anything more than a couple hours, at most, of surreal diversion." Harvard L. at Digitally Downloaded called it "a game which is often confusing and unintuitive, but it gets away with it under the guise of being true to its source material.

Accolades

See also
 Hamlet

References

External links 
 

2017 video games
Adventure games
Daedalic Entertainment games
Android (operating system) games
IOS games
Point-and-click adventure games
Puzzle video games
Video games developed in Russia
Windows games
Single-player video games